Sir Richard Atherton (22 September 1656 - 11 January 1687), was a Tory politician and an English Member of Parliament elected in 1671 representing Liverpool (UK Parliament constituency). He also served as Mayor of Liverpool from 1684 to 1685. He resided at Bewsey Old Hall,  Warrington and died in 1687. He was 11th in descent from Sir William Atherton MP for the same county in 1381 and was the last Atherton in the male line to have been a member of parliament.

Early life

Born in Warrington on 22 September 1656, the posthumous son of John Atherton (1624-1656). He was raised by his mother Mary Rawsthone (née Bolde, daughter of Richard Bolde, of Warrington). It is possible that both his mother and father descended from Edward I of England.

His father has been described as of the traditional political elite, a presbyterian, who had served as a Captain in the parliamentary army during the English Civil War (1642-1651) and taken prisoner at the Battle of Marston Moor. During peacetime his father served twice as Sheriff of Lancaster under the Lord Protector Oliver Cromwell. His elder brother died days after his father.

Atherton, unlike his father was an Anglican and a High Tory. He was educated at Brasenose College, Oxford in 1672 and Gray's Inn in 1675.

Career

Whilst his father had been a parliamentarian who fought against the royalists, Atherton’s political career took place during the period of  Restoration covering the reign of Charles II (1660–1685) and the brief reign of his younger brother James II (1685–1688).

His terms in office from Member of Parliament during the 1670s, followed by Mayor and Alderman of Liverpool, covered the whole Restoration period of Stuart monarchs, a period which ended with the death of Queen Anne. The growth of Liverpool  had accelerated  since 1660, by trading with America and the West Indies in cloth, coal and salt from Lancashire and Cheshire in exchange for sugar and tobacco. Atherton was first elected as Member of Parliament for Liverpool in 1671, on the interest 
of Lord Molyneaux, but was unseated on petition. He is said to have been a regular visitor to the Court of Charles II.

In 1684 he became Lord Mayor of Liverpool. He secured the surrender of the Liverpool Charter, which was delivered to George Jeffreys, 1st Baron Jeffreys, known as Judge Jeffreys at Bewsey Old Hall in 1684. 

Atherton was politically aligned to the young Earl of Derby, who had succeeded his father in the baronetcy at the age of one in 1672. The Stanleys of Bickerstaffe descended from Sir James Stanley, younger brother of Thomas Stanley, 2nd Earl of Derby, 3rd Baron Stanley. The Liverpool charter had been described as municipal subordination and a form of oligarchy.

The notes on the Liverpool Charters refer to Atherton as the first modern Mayor of Liverpool. He remained in this role until 1685, returning to represent the city in parliament from 1685-1687, and died in office, just one year prior to  the Glorious Revolution, which deposed James II.

Personal
Atherton inherited Bewsey Old Hall from his great-aunt, Dame Margaret Ireland, the widow of Gilbert Ireland upon her death in 1675. Atherton’s grandmother was Eleanor Ireland, and like Dame Margaret, also descended from Sir Thomas Ireland. A year later, now with considerable wealth, he married Isabel, the first daughter of Richard Holt of Castleton and Stubley on 22 November 1676. They had one son John, and three daughters, Catherine, Isabel and Dorothy.

He received a knighthood months after the aftermath of the Rye House Plot of 1683 (a plot to assassinate the King), a period of trials and executions. These were politically turbulent times, leading to the rebellion of 1685, the Monmouth Rebellion and Argyll's Rising. The ceremony took place on 22 June 1684 by King Charles II at Windsor Castle.

He remarried on 1 November 1686.  His  second wife was Agnes, the daughter of Miles Dodding of Conishead. They had no children.

He died in Warrington and was buried there on 11 January 1687. Immediately prior to his death he made a will on 30 December 1686 and appointed his brother in law, James Holt and friend William Bankes as guardians of his children.

His male line of descent became extinct with the death of his grandson, Richard Atherton (1700-1726) at an early age.

Legacy
His son, John Atherton (1678-1707)  inherited his estate and married Elizabeth Cholmondeley, of Vale Royal Abbey, and permitted the Unitarians to build a chapel on the Atherton estate. His grandson, was known as “mad Richard” Atherton (1701-1726), a high Tory, closed the chapel and was responsible for the construction of Atherton Hall.

His great granddaughter Elizabeth Atherton (1721-1763) married Robert Gwillym. Their son Robert Vernon Atherton Gwillym, who sat in the House of Commons from 1774 to 1780, changed his name from Gwillym to Atherton in 1779, almost certainly so he could inherit all of the Atherton estate, only to die in France in 1783, just a few years later.

Descendants

 Robert Vernon Atherton Gwillym, MP
 Reginald Heber, Bishop of Calcutta
 Horatio Powys
 Thomas Powys, 3rd Baron Lilford
 Thomas Powys, 4th Baron Lilford
 John Powys, 5th Baron Lilford
 Stephen Powys, 6th Baron Lilford
 George Powys, 7th Baron Lilford

References

1656 births
17th-century English politicians
1687 deaths
Mayors of Liverpool